Peter Staples (born 15 October 1947 in Melbourne, Victoria) is an Australian former politician for the Australian Labor Party. He was first elected to Parliament in 1983 as the Member for Diamond Valley.  When Diamond Valley was abolished in 1984, Staples transferred to the newly created Jagajaga, essentially the western half of his old electorate. In 1987, he was appointed Consumer Affairs Minister by Prime Minister Bob Hawke in his third ministry. Staples would remain a junior minister for nearly six years, serving as Minister for Housing and Aged Care and later Aged, Family and Health Services in the Hawke and Keating Ministries.

Staples lost his spot in the ministry to Frank Walker after the party's victory at the 1993 election. He spent the remainder of his career on the backbench until his retirement from politics in 1996, as stated in his documentary, The Dance of a Thousand Summers.

References

1947 births
Living people
Australian Labor Party members of the Parliament of Australia
Members of the Australian House of Representatives for Diamond Valley
Members of the Australian House of Representatives for Jagajaga
Members of the Australian House of Representatives
20th-century Australian politicians